Johny Fritz (born December 14, 1944) is a Luxembourgian composer.

References

1944 births
Living people
Luxembourgian composers
Place of birth missing (living people)
20th-century Luxembourgian people